The men's 400 metres sprint event at the 1952 Olympic Games took place between July 24 and July 25. Seventy-one athletes from 35 nations competed. The maximum number of athletes per nation had been set at 3 since the 1930 Olympic Congress. The event was won by George Rhoden of Jamaica, the second consecutive title in the event by a Jamaican. Herb McKenley repeated his silver medal performance from 1948, becoming the second man to win two medals in the event (after Guy Butler of Great Britain in 1920 and 1924).

Summary
In only their second Olympics, the Jamaican team came with the top runners including the world record holder George Rhoden and returning gold and silver medalists, Arthur Wint and Herb McKenley, respectively.  In the final, Rhoden on the far outside in lane 7 was unable to see the competitors staggered behind him.  Alone he went out hard.  The stagger behind him in lane 6, Ollie Matson, who like Rhoden trained in San Francisco, stayed in Rhoden's shadow, trying to match pace.  On the inside, in lane 3, defending champion Went also went out hard, quickly making up the stagger on Karl-Friedrich Haas to his outside.  Down the backstretch and through the final turn, Rhoden opened up a 5 metre lead on Wint, with Matson losing a couple of more metres.  Through the final turn, McKenley began to get up a head of steam, catching Matson just before the home straight, still two metres behind Wint.  At that point, Jamaica held the three medal positions, but McKenley was moving much faster than everyone else, quickly catching Wint and off after Rhoden.  Wint had nothing to offer the challenge and instead began moving backward.  Rhoden crossed the line just ahead of the fast closing McKenley, Matson also cruising past Wint, who was pipped by Haas at the line and almost caught by Mal Whitfield.

Background

This was the twelfth appearance of the event, which is one of 12 athletics events to have been held at every Summer Olympics. Jamaica's team was the same as in 1948: Arthur Wint (London gold medalist), Herb McKenley (silver), and George Rhoden (semifinalist; now also world record holder). The United States had 1948 bronze medalist Mal Whitfield return, this time joined by Gene Cole and future National Football League star Ollie Matson. Australia's finalist from London, Morris Curotta, also returned, making 4 of 6 finalists to come back.

Guatemala, Israel, Pakistan, Puerto Rico, the Soviet Union, Thailand, and Venezuela appeared in this event for the first time. The United States made its twelfth appearance in the event, the only nation to compete in it at every Olympic Games to that point.

Competition format

The competition retained the basic four-round format from 1920, and the only change from 1948 was that the first round heats were larger. There were 12 heats in the first round, each with between 4 and 7 athletes. The top two runners in each heat advanced to the quarterfinals. There were 4 quarterfinals of 6 runners each; the top three athletes in each quarterfinal heat advanced to the semifinals. The semifinals featured 2 heats of 6 runners each. The top two runners in each semifinal heat advanced, making a six-man final.

Records

Prior to the competition, the existing World and Olympic records were as follows.

George Rhoden set a new Olympic record at 46.09 seconds in the final.

Schedule

All times are Eastern European Summer Time (UTC+3)

Results

Heats

The fastest two runners in each of the twelve heats advanced to the quarterfinal round.

Heat 1

Heat 2

Heat 3

Heat 4

Heat 5

Heat 6

Heat 7

Heat 8

Heat 9

Heat 10

Heat 11

Heat 12

Quarterfinals

The fastest three runners in each of the four heats advanced to the semifinal round. Gerard Mach of Poland and Yuriy Lituyev of the Soviet Union were qualified but did not compete.

Quarterfinal 1

Quarterfinal 2

Quarterfinal 3

Quarterfinal 4

Semifinals

The fastest three runners in each of the two heats advanced to the final round.

Semifinal 1

Semifinal 2

Final

References

Athletics at the 1952 Summer Olympics
400 metres at the Olympics
Men's events at the 1952 Summer Olympics